This is a list of members of the Chamber of Deputies of Romania, elected following the 2020 Romanian legislative election.

References 

Romania, Deputies
Chamber of Deputies